LEVILE is a leading casting agency for diverse talent and audiences. The agency is based in the UK. LEVILE have cast for BAFTA nominated directors.

History
LEVILE was founded by Ola Christian in 2016, discouraged by the lack of direction afforded to his peers, a platform was developed to showcase hidden talent in the entertainment, tv and film industry.

The platform is well known for their monthly event Levile and Chill which has featured special guests such as Joivan Wade, Kayode Ewumi, Malachi Kirby and Samson Kayo. Also, the Levile Monologues actors such as Mo Mansaray has performed at the National Youth Theatre in Othello. Malcolm Kamulete cast in Top Boy on Channel 4.

In 2018, LEVILE was awarded the coveted Screen Nation DigitalisMedia Award for Favourite Entertainment & Lifestyle magazine.

See also
List of online magazines

References

External links

2016 establishments in the United Kingdom
Film magazines published in the United Kingdom
Online magazines published in the United Kingdom
Magazines established in 2016